Blood is the third album from the Leeds four piece Pulled Apart by Horses. It was released on 1 September 2014. On 6 September, it entered the UK Albums Chart at number 38, giving the band their first top 40 album.

Track listing

References

2014 albums
Pulled Apart by Horses albums